Denis Heskin (17 February 1899 – 30 April 1975) was an Irish Clann na Talmhan politician. A farmer by profession, he was elected to Dáil Éireann as a Clann na Talmhan Teachta Dála (TD) for the Waterford constituency at the 1943 general election. He was re-elected at the 1944 general election but lost his seat at the 1948 general election.

References

1899 births
1975 deaths
Clann na Talmhan TDs
Members of the 11th Dáil
Members of the 12th Dáil
Politicians from County Waterford
Irish farmers